Real Talk may refer to:

 "Real Talk" (R. Kelly song), a song by singer-songwriter R. Kelly on his eight solo studio album
 Real Talk (Fabolous album)
 Real Talk (Lecrae album)
 Real Talk (Man Overboard album), debut record by pop punk band Man Overboard
 Real Talk (Konshens album)
 Real Talk (Philippine talk show), a lifestyle talk show in the Philippines
 Real Talk Entertainment, a hip hop record label

See also 
 Real Talk 2000, an album by 3X Krazy